"These Foolish Things (Remind Me of You)" is a standard with lyrics by Eric Maschwitz, writing under the pseudonym Holt Marvell, and music by Jack Strachey, both Englishmen. Harry Link, an American, sometimes appears as a co-writer; his input was probably limited to an alternative "middle eight" (bridge) which many performers prefer.

It is one of a group of "Mayfair songs", like "A Nightingale Sang in Berkeley Square". Maschwitz wrote the song under his pen name, Holt Marvell, at the behest of Joan Carr for a late-evening revue broadcast by the BBC. The copyright was lodged in 1936. According to the Oxford Dictionary of National Biography, British cabaret singer Jean Ross, with whom Maschwitz had a youthful liaison, was the muse for the song.

Creation 

Although Maschwitz's wife Hermione Gingold speculated in her autobiography that the haunting jazz standard was written for either herself or actress Anna May Wong, Maschwitz himself contradicted such claims. Maschwitz instead cited "fleeting memories of [a] young love" as inspiring the song. Most sources, including the Oxford Dictionary of National Biography, posit cabaret singer Jean Ross, with whom Maschwitz had a youthful romantic liaison, as the muse for the song.

When the song was written, Maschwitz was Head of Variety at the BBC. It is a list song (Maschwitz calls it a "catalogue song" in his biography), in this case delineating the various things that remind the singer of a lost love. The lyrics – the verse and three choruses – were written by Maschwitz during the course of one Sunday morning at his flat in London between sips of coffee and vodka. Within hours of crafting the lyrics, he dictated them over the phone to Jack Strachey, and they arranged to meet the same evening to discuss the next step.

Rise to popularity 
The song was not an immediate success, and Keith Prowse, Maschwitz's agent, refused to publish it, releasing the copyright to Maschwitz himself – a stroke of luck for the lyricist.  Writing in 1957, he claimed to have made £40,000 from the song. Despite being featured in Spread it Abroad, a London revue of 1936, it aroused no interest until the famous West Indian pianist and singer Leslie Hutchinson ("Hutch") discovered it on top of a piano in Maschwitz's office at the BBC. "Hutch" liked it and recorded it, whereupon it became a great success and was recorded by musicians all over the world. This first recording by "Hutch" was by HMV in 1936. Popular versions in the USA in 1936 were by Benny Goodman, Teddy Wilson with Billie Holiday, Nat Brandywynne, Carroll Gibbons and Joe Sanders.
Billie Holiday's rendering of the song with Teddy Wilson's orchestra was a favorite of Philip Larkin, who said, "I have always thought the words were a little pseudo-poetic, but Billie sings them with such passionate conviction that I think they really become poetry." Holiday's version of the song peaked at No. 5 on the Billboard Pop Songs chart.

French version 
The song was translated in French under the title Ces petites choses ("These small things") and recorded by Jean Sablon in 1936 and by Ann Savoy in 2007.

Interpretations 

Various other versions have been recorded including vocal arrangements featuring:

Nat King Cole (on Just One of Those Things in 1957)
Bing Crosby (recorded December 15, 1944), 
In 1953, Billy Ward and his Dominoes recorded their version which made to No. 5 on the National Best Sellers chart.
Johnny Hartman
Frankie Laine
Sam Cooke
Sarah Vaughan
Ella Fitzgerald
Billie Holiday
Etta James
Joni James
Aaron Neville 
Frank Sinatra, (Point of No Return, 1961)
Sammy Davis Jr ("When the Feeling Hits You!", 1965),
Tiny Tim
Yves Montand
In 2005, Rick Astley covered this song for his 6th studio album Portrait.
In 2015, Cassandra Wilson on her Coming Forth by Day. 
Rod Stewart (US AC #13, 2002)
James Brown recorded the song three times, including a 1963 recording with strings that charted at No. 25 R&B and No. 50 Pop. 
Bryan Ferry covered the Dorothy Dickson version of the song for the title track of his first solo album These Foolish Things by Island Records in 1973. 
Bob Dylan sang on Triplicate (2017).
Seth MacFarlane covered this song for his 2015 album No One Ever Tells You.

Popular culture
It was sung by Florence Marly in the Humphrey Bogart film Tokyo Joe (1949).

References

Bibliography
 
 
 
 
 

1930s jazz standards
1936 songs
Pop standards
Torch songs
Songs with lyrics by Eric Maschwitz
Songs with music by Jack Strachey
Frank Sinatra songs
Billie Holiday songs
Carmen McRae songs
Mildred Bailey songs
James Brown songs
Billy Ward and his Dominoes songs
Jazz compositions in E-flat major